Brad Kroenig  (born 23 April 1979), is an American fashion model.

Career
Brad Kroenig was raised in Oakville, Missouri. His father was an environmental engineer and his mother a legal assistant. He studied at Florida International University with a soccer scholarship. He dropped out to become a model. His first major cast was nude shots for Abercrombie & Fitch. He moved to New York in 2001 and signed a three-year contract with the Ford model agency.

Kroenig started his modeling career in 2002 with a long-standing collaboration with fashion designer Karl Lagerfeld. Considered one of "Karl's Boys," he followed the designer to business trips, parties and holidays, and was sometimes mistakingly identified as his boyfriend. Kroening met Lagerfeld in 2003 during a photo shooting at Lagerfeld's villa in Biarritz in France. Lagerfeld's 2007 book Metamorphoses of an American is entirely devoted to Brad Kroenig.

In 2002, he worked alongside Naomi Campbell. He has graced numerous magazine covers including VMAN, Vogue, Numéro Homme and Allure. Kroenig has appeared in print campaigns for designers including Chanel, Fendi, Dolce & Gabbana, Abercrombie & Fitch, Roberto Cavalli, DKNY, Gap and Adidas, and on the runway for Chanel and Michael Kors.

Private life 
Brad Kroenig is married to Nicole Kroenig, the daughter of the tennis player Nick Bollettieri. He has two sons. His son Hudson is Karl Lagerfeld's godson, and has been appearing on Chanel's runway since he was two years old.

Kroenig lives with his family in Lakewood Ranch, Florida.

Honors 

 2005: Top Male Model by Models.com
 2015: Top 10 Male Models of All Time by Vogue

Biography 

 Karl Lagerfeld, Metamorphoses of an American, Steidl, 2007 (ISBN 978-3865215222)

References

External links
Ford Models profile
Kroenig's Instagram

Male models from Missouri
People from St. Louis
1979 births
Living people